Muzaffar Rahman Chowdhury was a Member of the 3rd National Assembly of Pakistan as a representative of East Pakistan.

Career
Chowdhury was a Member of the  3rd National Assembly of Pakistan representing Rajshahi-I.

References

Pakistani MNAs 1962–1965
Living people
Year of birth missing (living people)
20th-century Bengalis
People from Dhamoirhat Upazila